WIYN (94.7 MHz) is an FM radio station licensed to Deposit, New York, United States. The station is owned by Townsquare Media.

In September 2022, WIYN shifted its format from classic hits to classic rock as "100.3 & 94.7 The Eagle".

References

External links

IYN
Townsquare Media radio stations
Classic rock radio stations in the United States
Radio stations established in 1991
1991 establishments in New York (state)